Kashkjan (also Romanized as Kashkjān) is a village in Rahmatabad Rural District, Rahmatabad and Blukat District, Rudbar County, Gilan Province, Iran. At the 2006 census, its population was 27, in 10 families.

References 

Populated places in Rudbar County